LAMB Hospital is a 150-bed general hospital located in Dinajpur District of Bangladesh. The hospital was opened in 1983 and since then it is providing health care for the neighboring community especially the poor. LAMB Hospital is run by Lutheran Aid to Medicine in Bangladesh, an NGO of the American Santal Mission in Dinajpur. The hospital also established a low-cost telemedicine system with the help of The Swinfen Charitable Trust apart from diagnostic, general health care & acute care services.

History
Foundation of LAMB Hospital was envisioned by Rev. John Ottesen in the mid 1950s who was a missionary of the American Santal Mission in Dinajpur. Subsequently, a prayer group in Los Angeles developed the idea of having a hospital for providing tertiary, secondary and primary health services to the neighboring community. In 1979, LAMB Community Health and Development Program (LAMB CHDP) was started.

Location

References

Rebecca Rhodes, "LAMB Hospital, Bangladesh 2014," in Christian Medical Fellowship website, at https://web.archive.org/web/20150406174836/http://www.cmf.org.uk/publications/content.asp?context=article&id=26223 .
Nadine Hack-Adams, "LAMB Hospital, Bangladesh, 2013," in Christian Medical Fellowship website, at https://web.archive.org/web/20150406091857/http://www.cmf.org.uk/publications/content.asp?context=article&id=26170 .
LAMB website, at http://www.lambproject.org/?page_id=84 .

Hospitals in Bangladesh
Parbatipur Upazila